The Queensland Theological College (QTC) is a theological college in Queensland, Australia. Based in Brisbane, it is the training college of the Presbyterian Church of Queensland and takes a Reformed Evangelical or Reformed Protestant stance. The college was established in 1876 and has been known as the Presbyterian Theological Hall, the Reformed College of Ministries and the Consortium of Reformed Colleges. It adopted its current name in 2006. The current principal is Gary Millar, who succeeded Bruce W. Winter in 2012.  Millar is also the chairman of The Gospel Coalition Australia (TGCA).  Other full-time lecturers at QTC include Andrew Bain (Church History), Mark Baddeley (Systematic Theology), Douglas Green (Old Testament), Nick Brennan (New Testament) and Wesley Redgen (New Testament and Greek) QTC is a member institution of the Australian College of Theology.

References

External links
Official site

Presbyterianism in Australia
Educational institutions established in 1876
Education in Brisbane
Theological colleges of the Presbyterian Church of Australia
1876 establishments in Australia
Australian College of Theology